Princess Heunggyeong (Hangul: 흥경공주, Hanja: 興慶公主; d. 1176) was a Goryeo Royal Princess as the youngest daughter of King Yejong and Queen Sundeok, also the youngest sister of King Injong.

Biography

Life
It seems that she was born after 1109 not long after her older sister, Princess Seungdeok. She was the paternal aunt of the three rulers: Uijong, Myeongjong and Sinjong. Her maternal grandfather was Yi Ja-gyeom (이자겸) from the powerful Incheon Yi clan.

She was firstly called 'Princess–"gungju" (흥경궁주, 興慶宮主) but later on 9 October 1124 changed into Princess–"gongju" (흥경공주, 興慶公主). Then, she married Wang-Gyeong, Duke Anpyeong (왕경 안평공) and died in 1176 (6th year reign of King Myeongjong).

Husband's families and relatives
Her husband, Wang-Gyeong was born in 1117 as the grandson of Wang-Do, Duke Joseon (왕도 조선공), one of King Munjong's son. Gyeong's parent was Wang-Do's second son, Wang-Won, Duke Gwangpyeong (왕원 광평공) and Princess Ansu (안수궁주), King Sukjong's 3rd daughter. This made Heunggyeong as a closely relatives to her husband. Wang-Gyeong was firstly honoured as Count Anpyeong (안평백) and later became Duke Anpyeong (안평공). Based on the records left, Duke Anpyeong had a quiet personality and liked learning, which made him well-versed in scriptures and calligraphy, also a devout Buddhist. He later died a year after Heunggyeong's death at 61 years old.

References

Year of birth unknown
1176 deaths
Goryeo princesses
12th-century Korean women